Robert Ewing (August 10, 1849 – October 23, 1932) was an American politician and businessman. He served as the mayor of Nashville, Tennessee from  1914 to 1916, and he was the vice president of the Southern Iron Company.

Early life
Robert Ewing was born on October 10, 1849 in Nashville, Tennessee. His father was Congressman Andrew Ewing. His mother was Rowena Williams. He had a brother and two sisters, one of whom married journalist Henry Watterson.

Ewing attended Washington and Lee University in 1867-1868, while Confederate General Robert E. Lee was the university president.

Career
Ewing was a manager of the Buffalo Iron Company. He served as the vice president of the Southern Iron Company.

Ewing was a clerk and master of the chancery court, until he became the chairman of Nashville's board of public works and affairs. From 1914 to 1916, he served as the mayor of Nashville from 1914 to 1916.

Ewing was the business manager of the Nashville American, a newspaper later known as The Tennessean. He was also the secretary-general of the University of Nashville, and the secretary and treasurer of the Watkins Institute.

Personal life and death
Ewing married Hattie M. Hoyt on March 28, 1876. They five sons and 3 daughters. His wife predeceased him in 1931.

Ewing died in 1932 in Nashville. His funeral was held at the First Presbyterian Church, and he was buried at Mount Olivet Cemetery.

References

 (Accessed June 15, 2005)

1849 births
1932 deaths
American people of Scottish descent
Washington and Lee University alumni
Mayors of Nashville, Tennessee
Tennessee Democrats
Businesspeople from Tennessee